Wu Chengzhang or Woo Cheng-Chang (born 7 May 1924) is a Chinese basketball player who competed in the 1948 Summer Olympics.

Wu was part of the China basketball team, which finished 18th in the Olympic tournament. He scored 32 points in one of his games against Iraq, setting a record for the highest personal score for one game. Wu returned to China, where he played and coached basketball in his hometown of Shanghai until he retired. He is much respected in China as one of the country's last remaining 1948 Olympians.

References

External links

 
 

1924 births
Living people
Chinese men's basketball players
Olympic basketball players of China
Basketball players at the 1948 Summer Olympics
Chinese basketball coaches
Republic of China men's national basketball team players